Cycas fugax is a species of cycad endemic to Vietnam. It has only been recorded in the wild from Phu Tho Province, Vietnam, but may be reasonably common in cultivation in Hanoi.

References

fugax